Zita Alinskaitė-Mickonienė  (born 1939) is a Lithuanian textile artist.

In 1969 she graduated from the Lithuanian Art Institute, under the teachers Vladas Daujotas, Zenonas Varnauskas, and Sofija Veiverytė. From 1969 to 1974 she was a carpet factory artist.

Since 1970 she has participated in exhibitions in Lithuania and abroad.

Her early works were based on the composition of stylized, often symbolic figures. Later, her work became more minimalist.

See also
List of Lithuanian painters

References

Lithuanian artists
1939 births
Living people
Vilnius Academy of Arts alumni